Derek White (born December 9, 1970) is a Canadian professional stock car racing driver. He last competed part-time in the NASCAR Xfinity Series, driving the No. 13 Toyota Camry and No. 40 Dodge Challenger as an owner/driver for MBM Motorsports.

In March 2016, White was arrested and charged for smuggling tobacco from the United States into Canada. He was eventually suspended indefinitely by NASCAR.

Racing career

Early career and regional stock car racing
White spent 30 years drag racing in Canada, before deciding to switch to stock car racing in 2009. That year, he ran five races in the NASCAR Canadian Tire Series, with a best finish of 11th in his series debut at Autodrome Saint-Eustache. The following year, he ran eleven of thirteen races, recording a top ten at the season-opener at Delaware Speedway. At the end of the year, he was named Rookie of the Year.

In 2014, White made a start in the American Canadian Tour, competing in the season-ending race at Airborne Speedway; he finished 22nd after starting 33rd.

National series
In 2009, White made his Camping World Truck Series debut for Mario Gosselin at Martinsville Speedway, finishing 23rd after starting 34th.

In 2012, White was hired by SR² Motorsports to run as a road course ringer for the Nationwide Series race at Circuit Gilles Villeneuve. In the No. 24, he finished a career-high 18th. Before the 2014 Drive to Stop Diabetes 300 at Bristol Motor Speedway, White formed Motorsports Business Management with driver Carl Long as principal. The team made its racing debut as MBM Motorsports at the race with Matt Carter as driver of the No. 13. For six more races in 2014, White fielded rides for himself, Long and Mike Wallace, failing to qualify for four and not finishing all six races they had qualified.
 

In 2015, White and Long were joined by team owners Rick Ware and Curtis Key as partners, and the team eventually added the No. 40 team. Before the Winn-Dixie 300 at Talladega Superspeedway, White was penalized 15 drivers and owners points for an unsecured ballast.

On July 13, White announced that he would make his Sprint Cup Series debut at the 5-hour Energy 301 in Loudon for Circle Sport, the first Native American to attempt a Cup Series race in series history. After qualifying 42nd, he finished 39th, eleven laps down.

Personal life
From Kahnawake, Quebec, White is of Mohawk descent.

On March 30, 2016, White turned himself in for his involvement in a tobacco smuggling ring. The circle, targeted by Sûreté du Québec's MYGALE project, began in 2014 and had smuggled at least 158 transports to Canada, including 2,294 tons of tobacco worth $530 million. The tobacco was then sold to First Nations persons in the country. On April 4, he was indefinitely suspended by NASCAR.

Motorsports career results

NASCAR
(key) (Bold – Pole position awarded by qualifying time. Italics – Pole position earned by points standings or practice time. * – Most laps led.)

Sprint Cup Series

Xfinity Series

Camping World Truck Series

Canadian Tire Series

References

External links

 
 

Living people
1970 births
Canadian Mohawk people
Racing drivers from Quebec
NASCAR drivers
NASCAR team owners